Dooble is a free and open-source web browser that was created to offer improved privacy for users. Currently, Dooble is available for FreeBSD, Linux,  macOS, OS/2, and Windows. Dooble uses Qt for its user interface and abstraction from the operating system and processor architecture. As a result, Dooble should be portable to any system that supports OpenSSL, POSIX threads, Qt, SQLite, and other libraries.

Features 
Dooble is designed and implemented in order to improve privacy and usability.

Dooble includes a simple bookmarking system. Users may modify bookmarks via a bookmarks browser and a popup that's accessible from the location widget.
Along with standard cookie management options, Dooble also provides a mechanism that automatically removes cookies. If permitted, Dooble will occasionally remove undesired HTTP cookies.
Dooble Web Browser provides according to the News Portal Hongkiat an "easy to use download manager".
Dooble partially integrates the distributed search engine YaCy.
Most of the data that Dooble retains is stored using authenticated encryption. Dooble does not encode file associations and user settings. Dooble also provides a session-based model using temporary keys. The passphrase may be modified without the loss of data.
Included is a non-JavaScript file manager and FTP browser.
Version 1.53 introduced Gopher (protocol) support.
A security passphrase can be created for the browser. The password can be set from the Safe area of the browser settings. "You need to create a master password, otherwise everything is wiped when you exit the program", points out PCAdvisor.
Version 1.26 of Dooble introduced support for addons. The TorBrowser Add-On based on Vidalia was added in version 1.40. The Vidalia plugin was removed in version 1.49.
The Add-On with the name InterFace expands the browser with social network functions like a messenger with group chat, a friend list, an e-mail client, a chess game, and a forum function like a bulletin board.
InterFace is based on Qt and can be integrated as a plugin. It's based on a clone of the RetroShare Messenger. The plugin is considered deprecated.
Configurable proxy settings provide reasonable flexibility.
Dooble supports session restoration for authenticated sessions. If Dooble exits prematurely, the user may restore previous tabs and windows at the next authenticated session.
Some Web sites employ iFrames in order to distribute content from one or more third-party Web sites. Since this technology may raise privacy issues with some users, Dooble provides a means of blocking external content.

History 
The first version (0.1) was released in September, 2008. 

Since November 5, 2017 it uses the Qt WebEngine.

The version (2.1.6) was released on January 25, 2018.

Releases 
Dooble was also available on Nokia's N900.

Reception 
In 2014 Dooble was rated as the ninth of ten "top" Linux browsers by Jack Wallen. Dooble further has been announced in 2015 as one of the top five best secure browsers. PCWorld reviewed Dooble in 2015 on the feature side as "rendering quickly, even on image-heavy sites". The Guardian recommended Dooble in 2015 as an alternative browser against surveillance: "Try out a privacy-focused browser such as Dooble.".

See also 
 List of web browsers
 List of web browsers for Unix and Unix-like operating systems
 Comparison of web browsers
 Qt (software)
 Timeline of web browsers
 Web browser history

References 

Add-On Links

External links 

 
 Maemo Release Package 

Free web browsers
MacOS web browsers
Gopher clients
Software based on WebKit
Software that uses Qt
Web browsers that use Qt